Episkepsi is a village and a community in the northern part of the island of Corfu, Greece.  It is part of the municipal unit of Thinali.  In 2011 its population was 332 for the village and 537 for the community, which includes the village Agios Stefanos.

Population

See also

List of settlements in the Corfu regional unit

References

Populated places in Corfu (regional unit)